Buzi are small forts built along the northern frontier of China. They are prevalent in the Loess Plateau of Shaanxi, Gansu and Ningxia provinces, usually square or oval (as hill forts) and built out of rammed earth walls. The forts are built on hilltops, at strategic locations or within villages. A large number of forts are found in Tianshui (over 500) and Dingxi prefectures, totalling over 1400 forts. One of the densest concentration of forts is Tongwei County, which has the nickname "thousand forts county". Qin'an County is home to three larger castles.

Although each fort may not be impressive on its own, the combined defense line of forts has been compared to the Great Wall of China.

Usage
Although some of the forts date back to the Qin dynasty, they have been used as late as the Sino-Japanese war. During the Dungan Revolt, villagers sought refuge from the raiding and fighting in these forts, and new forts were even constructed with the same methods. As of now, most of the forts lie abandoned, partly due to the difficulty of reaching the hilltops. The courtyards of some forts have filled by farmhouses or Taoist temples.

The defenders inside the forts varied, with some larger forts being permanently manned by trained military, smaller ones were just refuge places for villagers from nearby.

References

 

Fortification lines
Chinese architectural history
Military history of China
Forts in China
Buildings and structures in Gansu